Gaurena sinuata is a moth in the family Drepanidae. It is found in Nepal and China (Sichuan, Shaanxi, Gansu, Yunnan, Tibet).

Subspecies
Gaurena sinuata sinuata (China: Sichuan, Yunnan)
Gaurena sinuata dierli Werny, 1966 (Nepal, China: Tibet)
Gaurena sinuata fletcheri Werny, 1966 (China: Shaanxi, Gansu)

References

Moths described in 1912
Thyatirinae